Hasan Ali (Punjabi and ; born 2 July 1994) is a Pakistani cricketer who plays for the national team in all formats. He made his first-class debut for Sialkot in October 2013. He made his international debut for Pakistan in August 2016 in a One Day International (ODI) match. The following summer, he was named in Pakistan's squad for the 2017 ICC Champions Trophy. Pakistan went on to win the tournament with Ali named player of the tournament after taking thirteen wickets. He became the quickest bowler for Pakistan to take 50 wickets in ODIs. In August 2018, he was one of thirty-three players to be awarded a central contract for the 2018–19 season by the Pakistan Cricket Board (PCB).

Early life
Hasan Ali is the son of Abdul Aziz Malhi, whom Ali considers a source of inspiration for his life. His family encouraged him to play cricket from an early age. Two local cricketers, one of whom happens to share the same name as Ata-ur-Rehman,are his childhood coaches and he considers Ata-ur-Rehman his mentor.

International career
In August 2016, Ali was added to Pakistan's One Day International (ODI) squad for their series against England and Ireland. He made his ODI debut for Pakistan against Ireland on 18 August 2016. He made his Twenty20 International debut for Pakistan against England on 7 September 2016.

Ali took his first five-wicket haul in ODIs against Australia on 22 January 2017.

In April 2017, Ali was added to Pakistan's Test squad for their series against the West Indies. He made his Test debut for Pakistan in the third Test against the West Indies on 10 May 2017.

In June 2017, Ali was named in Pakistan's squad for the 2017 ICC Champions Trophy. Pakistan won the tournament for the first time, beating arch-rivals India by 180 runs. Ali named as the player of the tournament after taking 13 wickets, and also won the Golden Ball. With 13 wickets, Ali became the joint leading wicket-taker in any Champions Trophy tournament, along with Jerome Taylor.

In October 2017, against Sri Lanka, Ali became the fastest bowler for Pakistan to take 50 wickets in ODIs in terms of number of matches played. The same month, he moved to the top of the International Cricket Council's ODI rankings for bowlers, taking 426 days from debut, the third-fastest of all time.

In 2017, Ali took the most wickets in ODIs by any bowler, with 45 dismissals and was named the Pakistan Cricket Board's Emerging Player of the Year. He finished 2017 as the top ranked fast bowler in the ICC Player Rankings in ODI cricket. The ICC also named him as the ICC Men's Emerging Cricketer of the Year.

In April 2019, Ali was named in Pakistan's squad for the 2019 Cricket World Cup. On 31 May 2019, in Pakistan's opening match of the World Cup, Ali played in his 50th ODI match.

In April 2017, Ali was added to Pakistan's Test squad for their series against the West Indies. He made his Test debut for Pakistan in the third Test against the West Indies on 10 May 2017.

In June 2017, Ali was named in Pakistan's squad for the 2017 ICC Champions Trophy. Pakistan won the tournament for the first time, beating arch-rivals India by 180 runs. Ali named as the player of the tournament after taking 13 wickets, and also won the Golden Ball. With 13 wickets, Ali became the joint leading wicket-taker in any Champions Trophy tournament, along with Jerome Taylor.

In October 2017, against Sri Lanka, Ali became fastest bowler for Pakistan to take 50 wickets in ODIs in terms of number of matches played. The same month, he moved to the top of the International Cricket Council's ODI rankings for bowlers, taking 426 days from debut, the third-fastest of all time.

In 2017, Ali took the most wickets in ODIs by any bowler, with 45 dismissals and was named the Pakistan Cricket Board's Emerging Player of the Year. He finished 2017 as the top ranked fast bowler in the ICC Player Rankings in ODI cricket. The ICC also named him as the ICC Men's Emerging Cricketer of the Year.

In April 2019, Ali was named in Pakistan's squad for the 2019 Cricket World Cup. On 31 May 2019, in Pakistan's opening match of the World Cup, Ali played in his 50th ODI match.

In September 2019, Ali suffered from a back injury which took seven weeks of rehab and which was immediately followed by a rib fracture taking him out of the game for many weeks as well. He would eventually regain his fitness in late 2020.

In January 2021, Ali, after two years, was recalled to Pakistan's Test squad for their home series against South Africa. On 1 May 2021, he took his fourth five-wicket haul in the first Test against Zimbabwe, and was also named the man of the match for taking nine wickets in the match. He also took his 50th Test wicket in the same match. He was also named the player of the series against Zimbabwe in 2021 on his performance of 14 wickets in the two-Test series.

In September 2021, he was named in Pakistan's squad for the 2021 ICC Men's T20 World Cup.

Domestic and T20 franchise career
He was recruited by Peshawar Zalmi for the 2016 Pakistan Super League. He made his debut against Karachi Kings in the first edition of the Pakistan Super League. He was retained by Zalmi in the player draft for the 2017 Pakistan Super League. He finished as the team's second-highest wicket-taker with 12 wickets from 11 matches.

In the 2019 Pakistan Super League, he was the leading wicket-taker in the competition, with twenty-five dismissals, and was named the Bowler of the Tournament.

In July 2019, he was selected to play for the Amsterdam Knights in the inaugural edition of the Euro T20 Slam cricket tournament. However, the following month the tournament was cancelled.

In January 2021, he scored a century in the final of the 2020–21 Quaid-e-Azam Trophy, and was named the player of the final and the tournament. In January 2021, he was named as the captain of Central Punjab for the 2020–21 Pakistan Cup. In December 2021, he was signed by Islamabad United following the players' draft for the 2022 Pakistan Super League. In March 2022, he was signed by Lancashire County Cricket Club to play in six matches in the County Championship in England.

Personal life
On 20 August 2019, Hasan Ali married Indian flight engineer Samiya Arzoo in Dubai. On 6 April 2021, their first child was born. They named their newly born girl Helena Hassan Ali.

Awards / Achievements
 PCB's Emerging Player of the year: 2017
 ICC World ODI XI: 2017
 ICC Men's Emerging Cricketer of the Year: 2017
 PCB's ODI Player of the year: 2018
 PCB's Test Cricketer of the Year: 2021
He was named in ICC Men's Test Team of the Year for the year 2021.

References

External links

 

1994 births
Living people
Pakistani cricketers
Pakistan Test cricketers
Pakistan One Day International cricketers
Pakistan Twenty20 International cricketers
Islamabad cricketers
People from Mandi Bahauddin District
Cricketers from Punjab, Pakistan
Sialkot cricketers
Cricketers at the 2019 Cricket World Cup
Peshawar Zalmi cricketers
St Kitts and Nevis Patriots cricketers
Central Punjab cricketers
Islamabad United cricketers
Lancashire cricketers